Tero Palmroth (born May 28, 1953, Tampere, Finland) is a former driver in the CART Championship Car series.  He raced in the 1988–1992 seasons with 12 career starts, including the 1988-1991 Indianapolis 500.  His best CART finish was in 12th position at the 1990 Indianapolis 500.

Racing career results

PPG Indycar Series

(key) (Races in bold indicate pole position)

Indy 500 results

External links
Driver DB Profile

1953 births
Living people
Sportspeople from Tampere
Finnish racing drivers
Champ Car drivers
Indianapolis 500 drivers

Walker Racing drivers
EuroInternational drivers